New Shah Faiz Public School was established in the small town of Dildarnagar in 2006 by  Md Naushad Khan.

Islamic schools in India
Schools in Uttar Pradesh
Education in Ghazipur district
Dildarnagar
Educational institutions established in 2006
2006 establishments in Uttar Pradesh